Piketoprofen (INN; trade names Calmatel, Picalm) is a nonsteroidal anti-inflammatory drug (NSAID) for topical use in form of a cream.

Chemically, it is the 4-picolineamide of the NSAID ketoprofen.

References 

Nonsteroidal anti-inflammatory drugs
Benzophenones
Propionamides
Pyridines